Mystery and Imagination is a British television anthology series of classic horror and supernatural dramas. Five series were broadcast from 1966 to 1970 by the ITV network and produced by ABC and (later) Thames Television.

Outline
The series featured television plays based on the works of well-known authors such as Robert Louis Stevenson, Bram Stoker, Mary Shelley, M. R. James, and Edgar Allan Poe. All bar one of the first two ABC series starred David Buck as Richard Beckett, originally a character from Sheridan Le Fanu's story "The Flying Dragon", as narrator. Beckett was made the central character of the series, taking the roles of various characters from some of the original stories. The first two series, although transmitted as two separate runs, were recorded in a single production block. The episode without Buck as the lead ("The Open Door") features Jack Hawkins. Unlike BBC dramas from the period, location exterior shots were also recorded onto video tape rather than 16mm film, giving a more consistent look to the production. Only series 5 was filmed in colour.

Episodes

Series 1

Series 2

Series 3

Series 4

Series 5

Archive status and availability
Of the episodes from the ABC era, only the versions of "The Fall of the House of Usher" and "The Open Door" (series 1) have survived. All the other episodes from the first three series are not known to exist, although the Thames episodes (series 4 and 5) survive. A brief clip from "Casting the Runes" (from series 3) also exists. Domestic audio recordings of the otherwise missing episodes "The Lost Stradivarius", "The Body Snatcher", "The Tractate Middoth", "Lost Hearts", "The Canterville Ghost" and "Room 13" also exist.

Network has released all eight remaining episodes on a four disc DVD set along with the surviving clip of "Casting the Runes". The surviving audio recordings of the missing episodes can be found on YouTube.

References

Wheatley, Helen. Gothic Television (Manchester University Press 2006) p36 ff.

External links

 Haunted TV.

1966 British television series debuts
1970 British television series endings
1960s British drama television series
1970s British drama television series
1960s British anthology television series
1970s British anthology television series
British supernatural television shows
British horror fiction television series
ITV television dramas
Television shows produced by ABC Weekend TV
Television shows produced by Thames Television
Television shows shot at Teddington Studios
English-language television shows
British fantasy television series